Behrouz Rahbarifar (born July 17, 1971 in Tehran) is a retired Iranian football player..

Club career 
Rahbarifar Joined Persepolis in 1993 under Ali Parvin, playing 9 seasons with them. at the beginning of 2003–04 season, Akbar Ghamkhar became chairman of the club and he decided to make reformations and players such as Rahbarifar who had good relations with Ali Parvin, were not included in his schemes. So Rahbarifar left the club and joined Pas. Rahbarifar scored his only goal for Pas against Persepolis from a penalty kick.

Club Career Statistics 

1 includes 2 matches in Tehran Hazfi Cup and 2 matches in Bushehr Basij Festival.
2 includes 2 matches in Naghsh-e-Jahan Cup and 4 Friendlies.
3 includes 3 matches in Naghsh-e-Jahan Cup.
4 Persepolis withdrew in 1997–98 League in the middle of season.

Honours
Persepolis
Iranian Football League (4): 1995–96, 1996–97, 1998–99, 1999–2000
Hazfi Cup (1): 1998–99 

Pas
Iranian Football League (1): 2003–04

References

External links

Profile at teammelli.com

1971 births
Living people
People from Tehran
Iranian footballers
Iran international footballers
Persepolis F.C. players
Azadegan League players
2000 AFC Asian Cup players
Association football defenders